Sachia Vickery (born May 11, 1995) is an American professional tennis player. She first entered the top 100 in 2018 and eventually reached a career-high of No. 73 in the world in the WTA rankings.

Her best results on the WTA Tour came at the 2018 Auckland Open and the 2018 Monterrey Open, where she reached the semifinals. Vickery, a former USTA junior national champion, has also won three singles and three doubles titles on the ITF Circuit.

Early life and background
Vickery was born in Florida to Paula Liverpool and Rawle Vickery. Her parents had both lived in Linden, the second largest city in the Caribbean nation of Guyana, and her mother is originally from the small mining town of Kwakwani. Her mother ran track in high school and her father was a professional soccer player. She also has an older brother named Dominique Mitchell who played college football at South Carolina State University. Through her former stepfather Derrick Mitchell, she is acquainted with LeBron James and considers his mother Gloria to be "like an aunt to her."

Her parents divorced when she was young, leaving Liverpool to raise her as a single mother. Her mother, who had been a school teacher in Guyana, at one point worked full-time during the day in the admissions office at Kaplan University and full-time at night as a bartender in a dangerous part of Miami to help pay for Vickery's tennis lessons. Once Vickery started to produce strong results at junior tournaments, she began training at the IMG Academy. While she was in Miami, she also worked with Richard Williams, the father of Venus and Serena, for a summer. After a year, she then moved to France to train at the Mouratoglou Tennis Academy for several years. By the time she was 18, she had moved back to Florida to be at the USTA National Training Center in Boca Raton.

Junior career
Vickery reached a career-high ITF junior ranking of No. 6 in the world. She recorded her first big result on the junior circuit when she reached the final of the Grade 1 USTA International Spring Championships in 2010 at 14 years old. The following year, she reached the semifinals of the Orange Bowl. To start the 2012 season, Vickery picked up her only Grade 1 tournament win at the Copa del Cafe in Costa Rica. She played in her last ITF junior tournament that November. Vickery finished her junior career by winning both the singles and doubles titles at the USTA Junior National Championship the following summer, which also clinched her two wild cards into the singles and doubles main draws at the US Open.

Professional career

Early years

Vickery played her first professional-level match in 2009 at an $10k tournament in Evansville, where she reached the semifinals. In 2011, she was awarded a wildcard into qualifying at the Washington Open but lost her first match.

As the 2013 USTA junior national champion, Vickery earned a wildcard to compete in the main draw of the US Open. She beat former Wimbledon semifinalist Mirjana Lučić-Baroni for her first WTA tour-level win in her first tour-level match. This put Vickery into the top 200 of the WTA rankings for the first time. She would consistently remain in the top 200 for the next four and a half years, aside for two weeks in 2016, but did not move into the top 100 until March 2018.

In 2014, Vickery earned another main-draw wildcard, this time for the Australian Open. She would go on to lose in the first round to fellow American Lauren Davis. Early in 2015, Vickery won her first two ITF pro circuit titles in back-to-back weeks in her home state of Florida, both of which came on clay. Vickery made two WTA quarterfinal appearances over these two years, one at Stanford in 2014 and another at Nottingham in 2015. She reached the main draw through qualifying at both events. Vickery also qualified for the main draw at Wimbledon in 2015 and the French Open in 2016.

Vickery made it through qualifying at the US Open and defeated Natalia Vikhlyantseva in the first round for her first Grand Slam main-draw match win in four years. She followed this up with the biggest tournament win of her career at the Central Coast Pro Tennis Open, a $60k event.

2018: Top 100
At the Auckland Open in January, Vickery made it to her first WTA Tour semifinal, the best result of her career. She knocked out defending champion Lauren Davis and former world No. 2, Agnieszka Radwańska, along the way before losing to world No. 2, Caroline Wozniacki. She backed up this performance by qualifying for the main draw of the Indian Wells Open, where she upset world No. 3, Garbiñe Muguruza, for the biggest win of her career. She then lost to the eventual champion Naomi Osaka, in the third round. Before the tournament she had been ranked for the first time in the top 100. With the result, she rose to a new career-high of No. 89 in the world. Vickery closed out the early-year hard court season by reaching her second semifinal, this time at the Monterrey Open.

Performance timelines

Only main-draw results in WTA Tour, Grand Slam tournaments, Fed Cup/Billie Jean King Cup and Olympic Games are included in win–loss records.

Singles
Current after the 2023 Australian Open.

ITF Circuit finals

Singles: 10 (3 titles, 7 runner–ups)

Doubles: 6 (3 titles, 3 runner–ups)

Head-to-head-records

Wins over top 10 players

References

External links
 
 
 
 

1995 births
Living people
American female tennis players
Sportspeople from Hollywood, Florida
Tennis people from Florida
African-American female tennis players
Tennis players at the 2015 Pan American Games
American sportspeople of Guyanese descent
Pan American Games competitors for the United States
21st-century African-American sportspeople
21st-century African-American women